Aldi Gjumsi (born 15 March 2002) is an Albanian professional footballer who plays as a forward for Tirana.

Career statistics

Club

Honours

Club 
Tirana
Kategoria Superiore: 2021–22
Albanian Supercup: 2022

Notes

References

2002 births
Living people
Footballers from Tirana
Albanian footballers
Albania youth international footballers
Association football forwards
KF Tirana players
Kategoria Superiore players